Nahamán Humberto González Avila (born 23 June 1967) is a retired Honduran football player.

Club career
Nicknamed el Constructor, González started his career at Real España and spent 6 years in Costa Rican football playing for Herediano, Alajuelense and Santa Bárbara and scoring 5 goals in 144 matches. He won the Costa Rican league title with Liga in the 1995/96 season as well as in 1996/97 but during that latter season he was loaned 5 months to Olimpia, winning another league title with them.

International career
González made his debut for Honduras in a May 1991 UNCAF Nations Cup match and has earned a total of 14 caps, scoring no goals. He has represented his country in 1 FIFA World Cup qualification match and played at the 1991, and 1995 UNCAF Nations Cups, as well as at the 1991 CONCACAF Gold Cup.

His final international was an August 1996 friendly match against Cuba.

Honours and awards

Club
C.D. Real Espana
Liga Profesional de Honduras (2):  1988–89, 1990–91
Honduran Cup: (1): 1992

C.D. Olimpia
Liga Profesional de Honduras (1): 1996–97
Honduran Supercup: (1): 1997

Country
Honduras
Copa Centroamericana (1): 1995

References

External links

1967 births
Living people
Association football midfielders
Honduran footballers
Honduras international footballers
1991 CONCACAF Gold Cup players
Real C.D. España players
C.S. Herediano footballers
L.D. Alajuelense footballers
C.D. Olimpia players
Honduran expatriate footballers
Expatriate footballers in Costa Rica
Liga FPD players
Liga Nacional de Fútbol Profesional de Honduras players
Copa Centroamericana-winning players